Tal Shahar is a moshav in central Israel. Located between Gedera and Latrun, it falls under the jurisdiction of Mateh Yehuda Regional Council.

History
The village was established in 1948 by immigrants from Greece, Poland and Turkey on the Burma Road on agricultural lands that had belonged to the depopulated Palestinian Arab village of Khirbat Bayt Far, in order to prevent Jerusalem being separated from the rest of Israel. It was named after Henry Morgenthau, Jr. (Morgentau is German for Morning Dew).

Economy
Shvil Izim, a goat farm and cafe, is located on the moshav, whose hen houses and cowsheds have been turned into artisanal cheese workshops and boutique wineries.The moshav also operates a banquet hall.

References

External links
Official website

Moshavim
Populated places established in 1948
Populated places in Jerusalem District
Greek-Jewish culture in Israel
Polish-Jewish culture in Israel
Turkish-Jewish culture in Israel
1948 establishments in Israel